Quakers are a supergroup consisting of three producers; Fuzzface (Geoff Barrow), 7-Stu-7, and Katalyst. Their debut studio album, Quakers, was released in 2012 and features a host of guest rappers, many of whom the band discovered using MySpace. The group is signed to Stones Throw Records.

History
Quakers' debut studio album, Quakers, was released in 2012. At Metacritic, which assigns a weighted average score out of 100 to reviews from mainstream critics, the album received an average score of 80, based on 14 reviews, indicating "generally favorable reviews". The album has been listed as number 41 in Amazon UK's top 100 albums of 2012. It also made Gilles Peterson's BBC Radio "Best of 2012" list.

In 2020, Quakers released a 50-track beat tape, Supa K: Heavy Tremors.

The group has no known affiliation with the Religious Society of Friends, also known as Quakers.

Discography

Studio albums
 Quakers (Stones Throw, 2012)
 Supa K: Heavy Tremors (Stones Throw, 2020)
 II - The Next Wave (Stones Throw, 2020)

Mixtapes
 Hip-Hop Quake Mix (Stones Throw, 2012)

References

External links
 

British hip hop groups
Hip hop supergroups
Stones Throw Records artists